Finn Hill may refer to:

 Finn Hill (Herkimer County, New York)
 Finn Hill (Oneida County, New York) 
 Inglewood-Finn Hill, Washington, a census-designated place in King County, Washington